The Lok Sabha constituency Chennai South is one of three constituencies in Chennai, Tamil Nadu. Its Tamil Nadu Parliamentary Constituency number is 3 of 39. It was formerly known as Madras South. It was created in 1957 through bifurcation of Madras Lok Sabha constituency. It is one of the most populous parliamentary constituencies in South India.

C. N. Annadurai, the first non-Congress chief minister of Tamil Nadu resigned his seat in 1967 after he was nominated for chief ministership. It was later contested and won by Murasoli Maran.

Assembly segments

After 2009
After delimitation, Chennai South consists of following constituencies

Before 2009
Chennai South Lok Sabha constituency is composed of the following assembly segments:
Triplicane
Mylapore
Saidapet
Alandur
Tambaram

Theagaraya Nagar

Members of the Parliament

Election results

General Election 2019

General Election 2014

General Election 2009

General Election 2004

General Election 1999

References
 http://164.100.24.209/newls/lokaralpha.aspx?lsno=13

External links
ECI, Chennai South
Chennai South lok sabha  constituency election 2019 date and schedule

See also
 South chennai Latest News
 Chennai
 List of Constituencies of the Lok Sabha

Lok Sabha constituencies in Tamil Nadu
Politics of Chennai